John MacLeod may refer to:

Politics
 John Norman MacLeod  (1788–1835), British Member of Parliament for Sudbury, 1828–1830
 Sir John MacLeod, 1st Baronet (1857–1934), British Member of Parliament for Glasgow Kelvingrove, 1918–1922
 John Macleod (Sutherland MP) (1862–?), Member of Parliament for Sutherland, 1894–1900
Sir John MacLeod (solicitor) (1873–1946), Lord Provost of Edinburgh, 1916–1919
Sir John MacLeod (Ross and Cromarty MP) (1913–1984), Member of Parliament for Ross and Cromarty, 1945–1964
 John MacLeod (clan chief), 16th-century clan chieftain, of the Isle of Lewis in the 1520s and 1530s
 John MacLeod of MacLeod (1935–2007), 29th chief of the Scottish clan Clan MacLeod

Sports
 John MacLeod (basketball) (1937–2019), American basketball coach
 Johnny MacLeod (born 1938), Scottish footballer
 John MacLeod (rugby union) (born 1973), Scottish former rugby union player for Glasgow Warriors
 Jack Macleod (born 1988), English footballer
 John MacLeod (canoeist) (born 1947), British slalom canoeist
 John MacLeod (water polo) (born 1957), Canadian Olympic water polo player

Other
 John Macleod (British Army officer) (1752–1833), British general
 John Macleod (theologian) (1872–1948), Scottish minister and Principal of the Free Church College
 John Macleod (physiologist) (1876–1935), Scottish physician, physiologist and Nobel Laureate
 John George Macleod (1915–2006), Scottish doctor of medicine and writer of medical textbooks
 John MacLeod (moderator) (1926–2002), Moderator of the General Assembly of the Free Church of Scotland 1983/84
 John MacLeod (minister) (1948-2021), minister of the Free Church of Scotland (Continuing)
 John Macleod (songwriter), English songwriter and musician
 John Macleod (art director), deputy design director of the New York Times
 John MacLeod, fictional character in Highlander III: The Sorcerer

See also
John McLeod (disambiguation)